Madaklashti (also known as Madaglashti) is a dialect of Persian spoken in the village of Madaklasht which is located in the Shishikoh valley in Chitral District, in the northern Khyber Pakhtunkhwa province of Pakistan. It is closely related to the Dari-Tajik dialects spoken in the Badakhshan region of Afghanistan and Tajikistan. It is completely isolated from other languages in the area and rarely draws any loanwords from Khowar. Madaklashti was also influenced by Pamiri languages especially Rushani. Madaklashti is surrounded by Gujari speakers to the south and Pashto speakers in the north. Somehow, like any other developing language, it doesn't deny the word formation process 'borrowing'.

References

Persian dialects and varieties
Languages of Khyber Pakhtunkhwa
Persian language in Pakistan